Woodbury is an Iron Age hillfort situated in the parish of Stoke Fleming, close to Dartmouth in Devon, England.

References

External links
 

Hill forts in Devon
Stoke Fleming